499 is a 2020 Mexican-American documentary hybrid film directed by Rodrigo Reyes. The film is a creative exploration of the legacy of colonialism in contemporary Mexico, 500 years after the Spanish conquest of the Aztec Empire. The film had its international premiere at the 2020 Tribeca Film Festival, where it won the best cinematography award in the documentary competition, as well as winning the Special Jury Award at Hot Docs the same year. It also won the EnergaCAMERIMAGE Golden Frog Prize for Best Docudrama.

499 has received support from several organizations, including Sundance Institute, Tribeca Film Institute, and the Mexican Film Institute.

Synopsis
Mixing fictional and nonfictional elements, 499 explores the legacy of colonialism in contemporary Mexico, nearly five-hundred years after Hernán Cortés conquered the Aztec Empire.

Release 
499 was shown at many film festivals including the Tribeca Film Festival in 2020.

 Hot Docs Canadian International Documentary Festival

 Festival Internacional de Cine de Morelia
 Portland International Film Festival
 Sofia International Film Festival
 International Documentary Film Festival Amsterdam
 The International Film Festival of the Art of Cinematography Camerimage

Reception 
Director Jim Jarmusch wrote about the film "Rodrigo Reyes has created a strong, beautiful and disturbing film that seems to occupy a genre all its own... 499 deftly weaves brutality with tender beauty, and harsh reality with the realm of dreams."

Bobby LePire of Film Threat calls it "a spellbinding movie anchored by a reliable performance by Eduardo San Juan Breña..."

Critic Carlos Aguilar reflects on the film as "a truly brilliant accomplishment of unconventional storytelling, form and theme coalesce to open a portal where textbook history becomes an active entity and clashes with the present for a forward-thinking exploration."

References

External links
 
 
 

2020 films
2020 documentary films
Mexican documentary films
2020s Spanish-language films
Films shot in Mexico
2020s English-language films
American documentary films
2020s American films
2020s Mexican films